Deft (formerly known as ServerCentral Turing Group) is an IT infrastructure provider of colocation, cloud infrastructure, IaaS, DRaaS, network connectivity, managed storage, and managed services in data centers across North America, Europe, Australia, and Asia. Some of the company's customers include CDW, Outbrain, New Relic, Ars Technica, Cars.com, and Shopify. In 2018, ServerCentral was named one of the fastest-growing private companies in the United States by Inc. Magazine for the eighth consecutive year.

History
Jordan Lowe and Daniel Brosk began hosting services for friends and local businesses on virtual private servers, growing to over 10,000 accounts. Growth spiked when Lowe and Brosk began advertising free domain names in exchange for prepaid hosting accounts on a daily deal website. The team switched from manual billing and account creation processes to a lifecycle hosting automation solution from SWsoft, which automated the full customer lifecycle.

In 2002, ServerCentral's headquarters and server operations moved to Chicago, IL.

In 2003, ServerCentral opened data centers in Ashburn, Virginia and San Jose, California. ServerCentral's private 10-Gigabit IP network connected the data centers. That same year, ServerCentral sponsored services for PHP.net, an open-source community for the development of PHP scripting. 

In 2004, ServerCentral expanded to Tokyo.

In 2005, ServerCentral rebranded its web hosting division to WingSix, and in 2008, sold it to UK2 Group in order to concentrate on managed data center infrastructure. ServerCentral expanded into Amsterdam and began its collaboration with CacheFly, a high-speed content delivery network (CDN).

In 2006, ServerCentral was one of the first large-scale networks to deploy native IPv6 traffic.

In 2009, ServerCentral expanded its data center footprint into Elk Grove Village, Illinois by signing a long-term leasing agreement with DuPont Fabros Technology (DFT). DFT has an environmentally conscious design, which includes battery-free UPS systems, advanced mechanical automation, and high voltage throughout the power distribution system.

In May 2009, server operations opened in a new Elk Grove Village, IL facility and ServerCentral successfully completed the SAS 70 Type II audit. SingleHop signed a $2.7 million agreement for colocation space and support at ServerCentral's Elk Grove data center. SingleHop signed a 5-year, $7-million contract with ServerCentral again in April 2011 for approximately 80 cabinets.

ServerCentral expanded three times within DFT between 2009 and 2012, bringing its total Elk Grove footprint to approximately 40,000 square feet and 5.5 megawatts of critical load.

In 2010, ServerCentral introduced Dedicated Private Cloud (DPC), a single-tenant infrastructure tuned for an enterprise setup. ServerCentral expanded within its Elk Grove Village, IL facility and made Inc. Magazine's list of the Fastest-Growing Private Companies in America.

In 2011, ServerCentral had 58 employees, $21.2 million in revenue, and 13% annual growth. In June 2012, ServerCentral launched ServerCentral Enterprise Cloud, a public IaaS. ServerCentral completed the Type 2 SSAE 16 SOC 1 audit and climbed Inc. Magazine's list of the Fastest-Growing Private Companies in America.

In 2012, ServerCentral expanded to 40,000 square feet and 5.5 megawatts of critical load in Elk Grove Village, IL.

In 2013, Brill Street and Company named ServerCentral a Top 50 Employer for emerging Gen Y talent in Chicago.

In 2014, ServerCentral announced DDoS Mitigation with Radware. ServerCentral also made the Inc. Magazine Honor Roll for being named to the Inc. 5000 Fastest-Growing Private Companies in America for the fifth consecutive year.

In 2015, ServerCentral expanded its cloud portfolio with multi-tenant, managed VMware.

In 2018, ServerCentral acquired Turing Group and became known as ServerCentral Turing Group (SCTG).

Moving into 2021, SCTG rebranded as Deft to better reflect its broad portfolio of offerings.

Services

Data Center Services
ServerCentral Turing Group operates twelve data centers across ten locations in which equipment, space, bandwidth, and add-on support are rented to retail customers. As of 2019, ServerCentral Turing Group is a SOC 2 Type II audited company and PCI-DSS compliant.

Managed Services
Managed services include dedicated servers, data center migrations, switch and router maintenance, VMware, storage, high-availability load balancers, backup and recovery, remote hands, firewalls, and application, service, and infrastructure monitoring.

Disaster Recovery Services
ServerCentral Turing Group provides backup, replication, and single or multi-site disaster recovery as a service.

Cloud Services
ServerCentral Turing Group cloud computing services are private, shared, and hybrid IaaS platforms. Colocation customers can directly connect to third-party public cloud providers. ServerCentral Turing Group also provides AWS Cloud Consulting services as a certified AWS MSP Partner.

Network Services
ServerCentral Turing Group's network services include private IP transit, dedicated data transport, optical fiber, managed network stacks, and native dual-stack (IPv4 and IPv6) service.

Global IP network
ServerCentral Turing Group operates a 10-Gigabit MPLS backbone with high-capacity bandwidth and interconnectivity between its global data center locations. ServerCentral Turing Group has deployed native IPv6 traffic on its private network since 2006.

Awards 
ServerCentral Turing Group was ranked among the top IT service and AWS consulting companies by Clutch.co in 2019.

ServerCentral was named a top Cloud Consultant and Managed Service Provider by Clutch.co in 2017.

ServerCentral received an award for Chicago's Best and Brightest Companies to Work For in 2015 and 2016.

ServerCentral ranked on CRN's Fast Growth 150 list, an annual ranking of the fastest-growing IT solution providers in North America from 2011 to 2015.

In February 2015, ServerCentral made the CRN Hosting MSP 100, a list recognizing American managed service providers who own and operate their own data centers and offer innovative, subscription-based managed services.

ServerCentral has held an A+ rating from the Better Business Bureau for outstanding customer service since 2001.

ServerCentral was named to Inc. Magazine's list of the fastest-growing companies in America in 2010, 2011, 2012, 2013, 2014, 2015, 2016, and 2017.

ServerCentral was named one of Brill Street + Company's top employers of Gen Y talent in 2013.

ServerCentral received Web Host Magazine's Editor's Choice Award for having “one of the most solid networks in the industry.” The review included accolades for the company's support team, hardware quality, and pricing.

References

External links
 Deft Official Website

Cloud computing providers
Cloud storage
Companies based in Chicago
Web service providers
Web services
Information technology companies of the United States
Internet technology companies of the United States